Forbes Collins (born 29 July 1941) is a British actor.

He is best known for his role as King John in the popular comedy Maid Marian and Her Merry Men. He also starred in the episode All About Scoring, Innit? in the drama, Minder, playing Arklow, as well as appearing as Jonas in Jesus of Nazareth (1977), some episodes of the first series of Blackadder, Worzel Gummidge series 2, episode 4 as Sergeant Beetroot and playing the Chief Officer in Doctor Who's Vengeance on Varos.

Collins also played Zacky Martin in Poldark (1975), playing a leading male member in the village of Sawle and supporter of Captain Poldark, whose house Nampara was nearby.  When the villagers of Sawle try one of their own for murder, Zacky is prominent in leading the process, advocating using "the old way".  This uses a candle which, should it stop burning before the end, is taken as 'proof' of guilt. With 'sentence' passed, as the 'guilty' man (who professes his genuine guilt) is taken away, the viewer sees that the wick in the candle had been pre-cut, and the flame would have naturally extinguished anyway.  In the quietly memorable and chilling scene that follows, the 'guilty' man is hurled from the cliffs to his death.

Other appearances include the 1974 "Dixon of Dock Green" episode, "Seven For A Secret - Never To Be Told".  His character, Pengelly, appears to have withheld information from Dock Green police who are investigating the death of a woman in a gas explosion.  He has also played policemen himself, notably Chief Superintendent Bailey in three episodes of the P. D. James-penned Adam Dalgliesh story, "Shroud For A Nightingale" (which TV mini-series starred Roy Marsden as Dalgliesh). His film career includes roles in The Hiding Place (1975), Intimate Games (1976), Black Joy (1977), Gulag (1985), Hitler's SS: Portrait in Evil (1985), Biggles (1986) and The Lady and the Highwayman (1988).

Filmography

References

External links
 
 Forbes Collins at Theatricalia

Living people
British male television actors
1941 births